The 2015 North East Lincolnshire Council election took place on 7 May 2015 to elect members of North East Lincolnshire Council in England. This was on the same day as other local elections and the general election for the House of Commons of the United Kingdom.

Council make up
After the 2015 local election, the political make up of the council was as follows:

No seats changed hands between parties at these council elections, with the exception of a by-election for an additional seat in East Marsh which otherwise wouldn't have been contested again until 2016 that UKIP gained from Labour. The same seat would be vacated only months later by the winning candidate, and was left vacant until the next set of local elections in the authority because it occurred less than six months before the 2016 local elections.

In four wards (Humberston and New Waltham, Scartho, South, and West Marsh) elected new councillors as the incumbents did not stand again.

Shortly after these elections, a by-election was held in the Croft Baker ward in July 2015 due to the death of the winning candidate Michael Burnett shortly after these elections. Labour held the seat.

Ward results

Croft Baker

Note: Burnett died shortly after this election. Labour retained the seat in the resultant by-election.

East Marsh

Note: A by-election was held for an additional seat in the ward, caused by the resignation of councillor Jon-Paul Howarth, whose seat was last contested in 2012. The results meant that Walker (who last contested his seat in 2011) held his seat and was elected for four years, as he would have done if there was no by-election and assuming he won. Bishell won the by-election seat and won a term of office for only one year. She resigned due to illness only several months later, and the seat was left vacant as it was less than six months until the 2016 local elections.

Freshney

Haverstoe

 

Note: Wallace previously represented Sidney Sussex from 1995 to 2003, before contesting Humberston and New Waltham that year and losing. He later went on to represent his original seat again from 2010 until he lost to UKIP in 2014.

Heneage

 

Note: Rudkin previously represented Scartho from 1999 to 2006. Smith contested this ward in 2012 as an Independent candidate.

Humberston & New Waltham

 

Note: Wheatley previously represented East Marsh (then known as North-East) from 1999 to 2003.

Immingham

 

Notes: Hill previously contested this seat as a Liberal Democrat in 2010.

Park

 

Note: De Freitas received more votes at this local election held solely within his ward than his party's general election candidate got throughout the entire Great Grimsby constituency which took place on the same day, thus suggesting that a large proportion of the people who voted for him to be their councillor actually voted for other candidates than the Liberal Democrats on their general election ballot papers.

Scartho

Note: This was the first occasion since 2011 in which the Conservatives managed to successfully win (regardless of whether it was a hold or a gain) a ward within the Great Grimsby constituency. Lindley was previously a Labour councillor for West Marsh from 2010 to 2014, but quit the party over not being selected for  the seat in which he lived in (Yarborough) and his disagreement with the all-women's shortlist imposed on the Great Grimsby constituency candidate selection for the 2015 general election. He had been nominated for his West Marsh seat, but pulled out on the night before Tim Mickleburgh was chosen as his replacement.

South

 

Notes: Stanland resigned little over a year after being elected. He previously contested Humberston and New Waltham as a Liberal Democrat in 2011. The resultant by-election saw Labour hold the seat with a small swing towards them. Hocknell previously represented Heneage ward from 2003 to 2011.

Sidney Sussex

 

Notes: Morland was a former Labour councillor for this ward from 1995 to 1999, before changing seats in 1999 to Croft Baker until 2003. He returned to the council when he became a Liberal Democrat councillor for this ward from 2006 to 2010. Stead previously represented Yarborough for his party from 1999 to 2003.

Waltham

West Marsh

 

Note: Wilson previously represented Heneage from 2010 to 2014. Watkin and Barker were elected to this ward as Independents in 1999, until losing their seats to Labour in 2010 and 2011 respectively.

Wolds

Yarborough

 

Note: Furneaux previously contested Park for the Conservatives in 2014.

References

2015 English local elections
May 2015 events in the United Kingdom
2015
2010s in Lincolnshire